The vitreous membrane (or hyaloid membrane or vitreous cortex) is a layer of collagen separating the vitreous humour from the rest of the eye. At least two parts have been identified anatomically. The posterior hyaloid membrane separates the rear of the vitreous from the retina. It is a false anatomical membrane. The anterior hyaloid membrane separates the front of the vitreous from the lens. Bernal et al. describe it "as a delicate structure in the form of a thin layer that runs from the pars plana to the posterior lens, where it shares its attachment with the posterior zonule via Weigert's ligament, also known as Egger's line".

References

External links
 Image at ivy-rose.co.uk

Human eye anatomy